Benjamin Bathurst (1711–1767) was the member of Parliament for the constituency of Cirencester for the parliament of 1754.

He was commissioned an ensign in the 2nd Regiment of Foot Guards on 28 November 1728. He resigned from the Army in March 1730/1.

References 

Members of Parliament for Cirencester
British MPs 1754–1761
Coldstream Guards officers
1711 births
1767 deaths
Benjamin